Maheshpur is a village in the Maheshpur CD block in the Pakur subdivision of the Pakur district in the Indian state of Jharkhand.

Geography

Location

Overview
Rajmahal coalfield is shown in the map. The entire area is overwhelmingly rural with only small pockets of urbanisation.

Note: The full screen map is interesting. All places marked on the map are linked and you can easily move on to another page of your choice. Enlarge the map to see what else is there – one gets railway links, many more road links and so on.

Demographics
According to the 2011 Census of India, Maheshpur had a total population of 5,797, of which 3,019 (52%) were males and 2,778 (48%) were females. Population in the age range 0–6 years was 832. The total number of literate persons in Maheshpur was 3,790 (76.33% of the population over 6 years).

Civic administration

Police station
Maheshpur police station serves Maheshpur CD block.

CD block HQ
Headquarters of Maheshpur CD block is at Maheshpur village.

Education
Maheshpur Raj High School is a Hindi-medium coeducational institution established in 1956. It has facilities for teaching from class IX to class XII.

Jawahar Navodaya Vidyalaya, at Silampur located nearby, is a Hindi-medium coeducational institution established in 2009. It has facilities for teaching from class VII to class X. The school has a library with 1,248 books. It has 15 computers and a computer aided learning lab.

See also
 Maheshpur Raj

References

Villages in Pakur district